Strathspey is the region around the strath of the River Spey, Scotland, split between the Moray council area and the Badenoch and Strathspey committee area of Highland.

The term Strathspey usually refers to the upper part of the strath from the source of the Spey down to the capital, Grantown-on-Spey, whereas the anglicised form, Speyside, refers to the area from Grantown-on-Spey to the mouth of the river at Spey Bay. Recently there has been some controversy over attempts to anglicise the name into Spey Valley. The tourist area from the south starts at Dalwhinnie and continues North along the A9 towards Newtonmore, Kingussie, Aviemore and on towards Grantown-on-Spey. The Canadian merchant Robert Simpson, founder of Simpson's department store, was born there in 1834.

Speyside is one of the main centres of the Scotch whisky industry, with a high concentration of single malt distilleries in the region, including the Glenfiddich and Balvenie distilleries.

Scotland's Malt Whisky Trail is a tourism initiative featuring seven working Speyside distilleries, a historic distillery and the Speyside Cooperage. The concept was created in the early 1980s. The region is a natural for whisky distillers because of three benefits: it is close to barley farms, contains the River Spey and is close to the port of Garmouth. The region also hosts the Spirit of Speyside Whisky Festival.

Twin towns
 Grantown-on-Spey, the capital of Strathspey, is twinned with Notre-Dame-de-Monts, Vendée, France 
 Speyside, the area downriver from Grantown-on-Spey, is twinned with Touques, Calvados, France

Notable residents 
 John Robert Grant (1729–1790), a Loyalist officer during the American Revolution and refugee settler in Summerville, Nova Scotia.
 Fr. Allan MacDonald (1859-1905), a Roman Catholic priest and highly important figure in modern Scottish Gaelic literature, had family roots in Strathspey.
 Iain Ruadh Stiùbhart (1700–1752), Jacobite Army officer and war poet during the rising of 1745.

See also

Speyside single malts
Strathspey (dance)
Strathspey Railway

References

Glens of Scotland
Badenoch and Strathspey
Moray
Landforms of Moray
Valleys of Highland (council area)